David Webb (born 21 April 1943) is a retired British rowing coxswain who competed at the 1976 Summer Olympics and the 1980 Summer Olympics.

Rowing career
Webb was selected for the Great Britain crew which competed in the men's coxed pair at the 1976 Olympic Games. The crew which consisted of James MacLeod and Neil Christie finished in seventh place. In 1977, while rowing for the London Rowing Club he won the coxed pairs with MacLeod and Christie, at the 1977 National Rowing Championships. Later that year he was part of the coxed pair that finished 10th overall after a fourth-place finish in the B final at the 1977 World Rowing Championships in Amsterdam.

A second Olympic Games appearance came in 1980 as part of the men's coxed pair again and with the same crew of MacLeod and Christie they finished in ninth place.

References

1943 births
Living people
British male rowers
Olympic rowers of Great Britain
Rowers at the 1976 Summer Olympics
Rowers at the 1980 Summer Olympics
Place of birth missing (living people)
Coxswains (rowing)